Atherigona biseta is a species of fly in the family Muscidae. It is found in China. Its host range is restricted to the Setaria species Setaria viridis, Setaria faberi, and Setaria pumila.

References

Muscidae
Insect pests of millets